Monica Chitupila was a Mozambican independence activist and politician. In 1977 she was one of the first group of women elected to the People's Assembly.

Biography
Chitupila was originally from Niassa Province. She became involved in the independence struggle, starting her training in 1967 in Nachingwea and rising to become the Provincial Commander of the FRELIMO Female Detachment in Niassa. Chitupila was a FRELIMO candidate in the 1977 parliamentary elections, in which she was one of the first group of 27 women elected to the People's Assembly. An employee of Fábrica Continental de Borracha,  she was re-elected in 1986 and became the longest serving member of the FRELIMO central committee.

References

Date of birth unknown
Mozambican independence activists
FRELIMO politicians
Members of the Assembly of the Republic (Mozambique)
Possibly living people
20th-century Mozambican women politicians
20th-century Mozambican politicians
People from Niassa Province